Choi Jung-won (born August 2, 1969) is a South Korean actress. She is best known in musical theatre, and has starred in Korean productions of Singin' in the Rain, Rent, Chicago, and Kiss Me, Kate.

Filmography

Television shows

Theater 
 Guys and Dolls (1989)-Ensemble
 West Side Story (1994)-Anita
 Grease (1995)-Sandy
 West Side Story (1997)-Anita
 Grease (1998)-Betty Rizzo
 Rent (2000)-Mimi Marquez
 Tick, Tick…Boom! (2001)-Susan
 Rent (2001)-Mimi Marquez
 Chicago (2001)- Roxie Hart
 Cabaret (2002)- Sally Bowles
 The Producers (2006)- Ulla Bloom
 Mamma Mia (2007)- Donna Sheridan
 Chicago (2008)- Velma Kelly
 Mamma Mia (2009)- Donna Sheridan
 Kiss Me, Kate (2010)-Lilli Vanessi 
 Chicago (2013)-Velma Kelly
 Ghost (2014)-Oda Mae Brown
 Urinetown (2015)-Penelope Pennywise
 Chicago (2015)-Velma Kelly
 Mamma Mia (2016)- Donna Sheridan
 42nd Street (2016)-Dorothy Brock
 42nd Street (2017)-Dorothy Brock 
 Billy Elliot (2017)-Mrs. Wilkinson
 Matilda (2018)-Mrs. Wormwood
 Chicago (2018)-Velma Kelly
 42nd Street (2020)-Dorothy Brock
 Billy Elliot (2021-2022)-Mrs. Wilkinson
 Chicago (2021-2022)-Velma Kelly
 Frida (2022)-Frida
 Next to Normal (2022)- Diana Goodman

Awards and nominations

References

External links
 

1969 births
Living people
People from Seoul
Actresses from Seoul
South Korean musical theatre actresses
South Korean stage actresses
South Korean film actresses
20th-century South Korean actresses
21st-century South Korean actresses